Patriotic Society can refer to multiple organizations:

 Patriotic Society (Russia), historical Russian charity organisation
 Patriotic Society (Venezuela), a Venezuelan revolutionary organization
 National Patriotic Society (1821–1822) formed by Walerian Łukasiński
 Patriotic Society or Patriotic Club (1830–1831) formed by various activists during the November Uprising

See also
 Chinese Patriotic Catholic Association